Søren Christensen (born 1940) is a Danish politician who served as High Commissioner of the Faroe Islands from 2005 to 2008. Previously, he was Secretary General of the Nordic Council of Ministers from 1997 until 2003.

Sources

See also
 List of Danish High Commissioners in the Faroe Islands

1940 births
Living people
High Commissioners of the Faroe Islands